Craig Huxley (also known as Craig Hundley; born 1954) is an actor, inventor, and musician. He led three albums that were released by Pacific Jazz Records in the late 1960s.

In 1967, he portrayed Captain Kirk's nephew in the Star Trek episode "Operation  Annihilate!". The following year, he played a different role in the episode "And the Children Shall Lead". As a child, he also acted on television in "Kung Fu", "The Flying Nun", and "Bewitched".

His first album, Arrival of a Young Giant, was a trio album by Hundley (piano), Jay Jay Wiggins (bass), and Gary Chase (drums) that was released in 1968. Craig Hundley Plays with the Big Boys, from the following year, had a big band added to the trio. The 1969 release, Rhapsody in Blue, also featured a big band, and included Ed Thigpen on drums.

Huxley invented a musical instrument – an aluminum refinement of the blaster beam – in the 1970s. His design was patented in 1984. The instrument was used in the soundtrack to Star Trek: The Motion Picture, and Huxley played it for the soundtrack to 10 Cloverfield Lane.

References

External links
 
 Craig Huxley alias Craig Hundley and Craig Hundley Trio at Discogs

American male pianists
20th-century American pianists
20th-century American male musicians
American male child actors